The Zhygulyanka (also: Дарагабуж - Darahabuzh) is a river in Brest Region in south-west Belarus. It is a left tributary of the Yaselda. It flows through Chornaye Lake and the village of Zdzitava.

Rivers of Brest Region
Rivers of Belarus